Kazimierz Aleksander Gzowski (October 8, 1901 in Sumy, Kharkov Governorate, Russian Empire – June 25, 1986 in London, Great Britain) was a Polish cavalry officer and horse rider who competed in the 1928 Summer Olympics.

He won the silver medal with the Polish team in the team jumping with his horse Mylord after finishing fourth in the individual jumping.

During the World War I Gzowski served in the Imperial Russian Army and since 1919 in the Polish. On 30 April 1935 he retired from military.

Gzowski fought in World War II with the Polish forces in the West. After the war, he stayed in England.

External links
profile 
dataOlympics profile

1901 births
1986 deaths
Sportspeople from Sumy
People from Sumsky Uyezd
People from the Russian Empire of Polish descent
Equestrians at the 1928 Summer Olympics
Olympic equestrians of Poland
Polish male equestrians
Olympic silver medalists for Poland
Olympic medalists in equestrian
Russian military personnel of World War I
Polish military personnel of World War II
Polish exiles
Medalists at the 1928 Summer Olympics